Mapimí may refer to any of several geographical features in Mexico:

Mapimí, Durango, a city
Mapimí (municipality), its surrounding municipality
Bolsón de Mapimí, an endorheic river basin
Mapimí Biosphere Reserve
The Mapimí Silent Zone, an alleged pocket of radio silence